Onorio de Verme or Honuphrius a Verme (1588–1637) was a Roman Catholic prelate who served as Bishop of Ravello e Scala (1624–1637).

Biography
Onorio de Verme was born in Palermo, Italy in 1588.
On 29 July 1624, he was appointed during the papacy of Pope Urban VIII as Bishop of Ravello e Scala.
On 11 August 1624, he was consecrated bishop by Giovanni Garzia Mellini, Cardinal-Priest of Santi Quattro Coronati, with Antonio Provana, Archbishop of Durrës, and Charles Bobba de Montferrat, Bishop of Saint-Jean-de-Maurienne, serving as co-consecrators. 
He served as Bishop of Ravello e Scala until his death in 1637.

References

External links and additional sources
 (for Chronology of Bishops) 
 (for Chronology of Bishops) 

Bishops appointed by Pope Urban VIII
1588 births
1637 deaths
People from Ravello
17th-century Italian Roman Catholic bishops